Katsuki Sakagami (born 7 November 1992) is a Japanese freestyle wrestler. In 2018, she won one of the bronze medals in the women's freestyle 57 kg event at the 2018 Asian Games held in Jakarta, Indonesia.

In 2013, she won the silver medal in the women's 58 kg freestyle event in belt wrestling at the 2013 Summer Universiade held in Kazan, Russia.

At the 2017 Asian Wrestling Championships held in New Delhi, India, she won one of the bronze medals in the women's 58 kg event.

Achievements

References

External links 
 

Living people
1992 births
Place of birth missing (living people)
Japanese female sport wrestlers
Asian Games medalists in wrestling
Wrestlers at the 2018 Asian Games
Asian Games bronze medalists for Japan
Medalists at the 2018 Asian Games
Medalists at the 2013 Summer Universiade
Asian Wrestling Championships medalists
21st-century Japanese women